The Intercontinental Cup is a roller hockey competition organized by World Skate and usually contested between the World Skate Europe and the World Skate America champions clubs.

History
The Intercontinental Cup was established in 1985 and was organized by FIRS.

In 2006, the then-CIRH (Comité Internationale de Rink-Hockey) tried to establish a World Club Championship, but that competition was quickly discontinued in favor of the Intercontinental Cup.

In 2017, the Fédération Internationale de Roller Sports (FIRS) merged with the International Skateboarding Federation (ISF) to form World Skate, which organized the 2017 Intercontinental Cup played in a Final Four format by the 2016 and 2017 CERH European League champions, Benfica and Reus, and the 2016 and 2017 CSP South American Club Championship/CPP Pan-American Club Championship winners, Andes Talleres and Concepción, with Benfica facing Andes Talleres and Reus facing Concepción.

In 2018, the World Skate created the women's tournament, played in a Final Four formats by the four finalists of Europe and America.

In 2021, the Intercontinental Cup was disputed by the european champions Sporting and the runners-up FC Porto on a two-legged tie.

Winners

Statistics

Winners by team

Winners by country

References

External links 
 World Competitions at RinkHockey.net

Roller hockey competitions
Recurring sporting events established in 1983
Multi-national professional sports leagues